NGC 3805 is a lenticular galaxy located about 330 million light-years away in the constellation Leo. The galaxy was discovered by astronomer William Herschel on April 25, 1785. NGC 3805 is a member of the Leo Cluster.

See also
 List of NGC objects (3001–4000)

References

External links
 

3805
036224
06642
Leo (constellation)
Leo Cluster
Lenticular galaxies
Astronomical objects discovered in 1785